Vine Street is a street in Westminster, London, running from Swallow Street, parallel to Regent Street and Piccadilly. It is now a dead end that was shortened from a longer road in the early 18th century owing to the building of Regent Street.

From the 18th to 20th century, it was home to Vine Street Police Station, which grew from a watch-house into one of the busiest police stations in the world. The Marquess of Queensberry was charged with libel against Oscar Wilde here in 1895. There was also a court house in the 18th and early 19th century. The street's association with law has led to it being grouped with Bow Street and Marlborough Street on the standard British Monopoly board.

Geography
It consists mainly of the rear facades of buildings facing onto other streets. It connects to Swallow Street at its western end and an alleyway, Piccadilly Place halfway along. At the eastern end, the Man in the Moon Passage provides foot access to Regent Street. The nearest tube station is Piccadilly Circus.

History

The street is named after The Vine, an 18th-century public house, which in turn may have been named after a vineyard that existed at this location in Roman times. It was documented on ratebooks as Little Swallow Street in 1675. It was laid out around 1686 and originally ran further, along what is now the Man in the Moon Passage. John Rocque's Map of London, 1746 shows Vine Street extending from Piccadilly northeast to Warwick Street. In 1720, the main properties on the street were a brewery and a carpenter's yard.

Vine Street was split into two sections following the construction of Regent Street between 1816 and 1819. The Man in the Moon Passage was created at this time, named after a former pub at this location. The northern section towards Warwick Street was renamed Great Vine Street, and then a branch of Warwick Street itself. It ceased to exist after the reconstruction of the Regent Street Quadrant in 1920.

In 1853, Charles Moreign purchased several small houses at the end of Vine Street so they could be redeveloped into St James's Hall, Piccadilly. A rear entrance to the hall backed onto the street. The hall was demolished in 1905 and replaced by the Piccadilly Hotel, which also backs onto Vine Street.

Police and law
Vine Street has long been associated with the police and law. Around 1751–52, a court house was built at the western end of the street, on the corner of what is now Piccadilly Place. It closed in 1836 following the reorganisation of the court system around Westminster and was subsequently occupied by the lawyer Edward Gaffin.

The Vine Street Police Station was at No. 10. It was originally built as a watch-house around 1767, and rebuilt following a fire in 1786 that destroyed several properties on and around the street. A school operated on the first floor, and two cells were in the basement. A further storey was added to the building in 1816. It was renamed Vine Street Police Station in 1829 following the establishment of the Metropolitan Police District. The school moved from the building to Swallow Street in 1836, where it stayed before closing in 1881. The police station went on to become one of the main stations in Central London. In 1850, it was extended over the 18th century courthouses. At one point in the 19th century it was one of the busiest police stations in the world. An Arts and Crafts extension wing was built on the station in 1897, that faced onto Swallow Street. The Man in the Moon pub, adjacent to the station, was bought by the police receiver in 1931.

The station closed in 1940 (along with nearby Marlborough Street Magistrates Court) to be replaced with an integrated West End Central Police Station at Savile Row, with the street being renamed Piccadilly Place. A subsequent rise in foot traffic around the area, and associated crime, led to the station being re-opened in 1966, with the street being renamed back to Vine Street in 1972. The police station closed in 1997 and the building was demolished in 2005 for redevelopment.

Events and incidents
The Dutch artist Peter Scheemakers moved into a house on the western edge of Vine Street around 1741. He stayed there until 1769, when he returned to Antwerp.

On 2 September 1791, composer Frantisek Kotzwara died at prostitute Susannah Hill's house at No. 5 Vine Street from erotic asphyxiation following a sexual act that involved tying his neck to a doorknob. Hill was charged with Kotzwara's murder but later acquitted.

In 1895, the Marquess of Queensbury was charged at Vine Street Police Station with libel against Oscar Wilde. This ultimately led to Wilde's arrest and subsequent imprisonment. On 29 May 1901, the stonemason James Schulty reported he had information about the murder of Mary Ann Austin but refused to reveal details anywhere except the Vine Street Police Station. The information was discarded by the Metropolitan Police as of little value.

In 1928, an officer working at the station was sacked after it was revealed he had been gathering bribes from local nightclubs and brothels, acquiring over £17,000 (now £) in the process. The officer subsequently committed suicide and the station is said to be haunted by his ghost. Related incidents include reports of papers being inexplicably moved, and an officer hearing footsteps despite knowing he was the only one in the station.

The street and station are mentioned in the Pogues' song "The Old Main Drag" on their 1985 album Rum Sodomy & the Lash. It refers to the station and street's unpopularity with some of London owing to their distrust of the police force. Because of its relatively hidden location and proximity to Piccadilly Circus, the street suffers from crime, which has led to Westminster City Council gating off the Man in the Moon Passage so service vehicles can access connecting buildings safely.

The street features as a property with a purchase price of £200 on the British Monopoly board. It is one of a group of three, coded orange, with connections to law, and is named after the police station. The other two orange properties, Bow Street and Marlborough Street, which are both valued at £180, are named after the Bow Street Runners and Marlborough Street Magistrates Court respectively. Since the Man in the Moon is now closed, students on a Monopoly board pub crawl drink in one of the nearby pubs, such as those on Swallow Street, instead.

References

Notes

Citations

Sources

Streets in the City of Westminster
Former Metropolitan Police stations